This list ranks the tallest buildings in Prague that stand at least  tall. For non-building structures, see article List of tallest structures in Prague.

Tallest buildings 
Tallest buildings in Prague as of March 2019.

References

See also 

 List of tallest structures in Prague
 List of tallest buildings in the Czech Republic

Skyscrapers in the Czech Republic
Lists of buildings and structures in the Czech Republic
Prague-related lists
Buildings and structures in Prague